Bill Braun is an American former NASCAR driver who, in 1951, competed in the Grand National race, held at Daytona International Speedway. Braun emerged with a 10th-place finish in the race.

References

External links
racing-reference.info Grand National statistics

Living people
NASCAR drivers
Sportspeople from Paterson, New Jersey
Racing drivers from New Jersey
Year of birth missing (living people)